Kevin James Dennerly-Minturn (born 18 May 1989) is a New Zealand badminton player. In 2014, he competed at the Commonwealth Games in Glasgow, Scotland.

Career 
Dennerly-Minturn is an Auckland player on the international circuit and is also from the College Rifles badminton club. He comes from a very active and sporting family.  From an early age he was gifted at a number of sports including cricket but pursued his passion for badminton and is now a key feature of the New Zealand doubles set up. He is based in Denmark for most of the year playing and training in the tough European environment.

In 2008, he was the semi-finals in the men's and mixed doubles event at the Oceania Championships and won bronze. He also won bronze in 2014 and silver in 2015 in the men's doubles event partnered with Oliver Leydon-Davis. Partner with Oliver, he won the 2012 Auckland and 2013 Mexico International tournaments. In the mixed doubles, he won the Waikato International tournament teamed up with Susannah Leydon-Davis.

In 2017, he won the silver medal at the Oceania Championships in the men's doubles event partnered with Niccolo Tagle. In the mixed doubles event, he teamed-up with Danielle Tahuri, and they reach the semi-final round but was defeated by the top seeds from Australia.

Achievements

Oceania Championships 
Men's doubles

Mixed doubles

BWF International Challenge/Series 
Men's doubles

Mixed doubles

  BWF International Challenge tournament
  BWF International Series tournament
  BWF Future Series tournament

References

External links 
 

1989 births
Living people
Sportspeople from Auckland
New Zealand male badminton players
Badminton players at the 2014 Commonwealth Games
Commonwealth Games competitors for New Zealand